Benjamin Huefner (born January 7, 1991) is a German professional ice hockey defenceman. He is currently playing for Eisbären Berlin in the Deutsche Eishockey Liga (DEL).

References

External links

1991 births
Living people
Eisbären Berlin players
German ice hockey defencemen